Line 15 of the Beijing Subway is a rapid transit rail line in northern Beijing.

The line uses Sparcs CBTC system supplied by Nippon Signal. It cost ¥17.6 billion. The line features 6-car trains similar to other lines in the Beijing Subway. Tunnels of Line 15 are up to  underground, making them the deepest in Beijing's subway system. Trains run every 2–3 minutes during the rush hour with some trains performing express services. A journey on a local all stop train from Fengbo to Qinghuadongluxikou station takes about 60 minutes.

Route
The line run from Qinghuadongluxikou in Haidian District to Fengbo in Shunyi District. Line 15 travels underground from Qinghuadongluxikou to Maquanying, and then goes above ground on an elevated track to Houshayu before returning underground and going underneath the Chaobai River to Fengbo. The elevated section is high enough to allow elevated roads to pass underneath. A major public venue on the Line 15 is the New China International Exhibition Center (New CIEC) at the China International Exhibition Center station. New CIEC holds the annual Beijing International Automotive Exhibition, which attracted 800,000 visitors in 2012.

List of Stations

History
During planning of Line 15, the eastern terminus was moved from Fuqian Jie  to the east bank of the Chaobai River. Construction began on Phase I of Line 15 in Shunyi District on April 11, 2009. According to the construction schedule in 2009, the easternmost Shunyi section of Phase I ( in length with seven stations) would be opened first on December 30, 2011. The remainder of Phase I would follow in May 2013.

The route of Line 15's Phase II has been revised several times over the years. In April 2009, Phase II plans showed the western half of Line 15 running from Xiyuan Station in Haidian District, through the campus of Tsinghua University, Zhongguancun, and the Olympic Green, and joining  at Wangjing West. When track-laying began in Phase I on October 28, 2009, the schedule and alignment of  underwent a major revision, with one proposal extending Line 15 westward as originally planned with additional stations and another proposal sending Line 15 southward and parallel to Line 8 to provide relief for congested Line 4 and 5. Ultimately the route west to Qinghuadongluxikou was selected and the design of Xiyuan station leaves enough space to build another platform in between Line 4 and Line 16 platform for potential Line 15 extension westward beyond Qinghuadongluxikou.

The second, from Houshayu to Fengbo, followed at the end of 2011. The third section, from Qinghuadongluxikou to Wangjing West, opened on December 28, 2014.

In 8 July 2022, an EIA document regarding Phase III construction of Beijing rail transport system (2022–2027) announced the phase 2 of line 15, with 3.5 km long extension from Fengbo to Nancai.

Line 15, Phase I stations, from east to west with transfers in parentheses:

 * Wangjing East station did not open in 2010 due to lack of connections with the surrounding road system. It was opened on 31 December 2016.

** Datunlu East station did not open in 2014 because the transfer corridors to Line 5 were still under construction. It was opened on 26 December 2015.

Rolling Stock

Gallery

References

External links

 Official Beijing Subway Website
 Line 15 Information Page at the Beijing Infrastructure Investment Co. Ltd. 

Beijing Subway lines
Railway lines opened in 2010
2010 establishments in China
750 V DC railway electrification